The England national women's netball team, also known as the Vitality Roses, represent England in international netball competition. England are coached by Jess Thirlby, and are currently captained by Natalie Metcalf. As of 1 July 2020, the team is ranked third in the INF World Rankings. England have won one silver and several bronze medals at the World Cup and have won one gold medal at the Commonwealth Games.

History
The England national netball team was established in 1963, ahead of the inaugural Netball World Championships held in Eastbourne that year. England have appeared at every World Championships (since renamed as the World Cup) and most recently the team competed at the 2019 Netball World Cup, finishing third. Their highest placing at a World Championship was second in 1975. They have twice won the World Netball Series, a tournament with experimental rules designed to speed up the game. Their best result in a major tournament is a gold medal in the 2018 Commonwealth Games.

Although international netball was historically dominated by Australia and New Zealand, in recent years England have recorded several impressive victories over Australia, New Zealand and Jamaica, signalling their increasing competitiveness against other elite nations. This development was demonstrated in the team's second place at the 2018 Quad Series, where they lost to Australia by a narrow margin. England's rapid improvement occurred under the tutelage of then-head coach Tracey Neville, who was permanently appointed to the role in September 2015. The team earned their first Commonwealth Games gold medal in a landmark victory over Australia in April 2018 and several months later rose to second on the INF World Rankings. Following a narrow semi-final defeat and eventual bronze medal at the 2019 World Cup in Liverpool, Neville stood down from the role. She was replaced as coach by Jess Thirlby, who represented England during her playing career and coached under-age national teams and Team Bath in the Superleague.

The captain is Nat Metcalf

Players

Roses squad 
The current squad was selected for the 2022 Quad Series.

 
  
 
Player statistics can be found here.

Notable past players

 Lyn Carpenter
 Tracey Neville 
 Amanda Newton
 Abby Sargent
 Kendra Slawinski
 Pamela Cookey
 Tamsin Greenway
 Sonia Mkoloma
 Ama Agbeze
 Fiona Murtagh
 Lucia Sdao
 Alison Spink
 Eboni Usoro-Brown
 Stacey Franics-Bayman

Competitive record

Honours
 BBC Sports Team of the Year Award – 2018

Kit suppliers
England's kits and off-court ranges are currently supplied by Nike. The global sports brand announced a multi-year deal with England Netball, the national team and the organisation's 3,000 clubs across the country in 2018. Before the Nike announcement, the Roses kits were provided by BLK.

References

External links
 Official Website
 Our Netball History – Archival website dedicated to English netball

 
National netball teams of Europe